Pontiturboella rufostrigata is a species of minute sea snail, a marine gastropod mollusk or micromollusk in the family Rissoidae.

Description

Distribution

References

 Hesse P. (1916). Mollusken von Varna und Umgebung. Nachrichtsblatt der Deutschen Malakozoologischen Gesellschaft 48(4): 143-158

Rissoidae
Gastropods described in 1916